Kalappia celebica is a species of legume in the family Fabaceae. It is a tree found only in Sulawesi, Indonesia.

References

Dialioideae
Endemic flora of Sulawesi
Trees of Sulawesi
Vulnerable plants
Taxonomy articles created by Polbot